The five Latin dances competition at the 2010 Asian Games in Guangzhou was held on 13 November at the Zengcheng Gymnasium. The five Latin dances are the samba, cha-cha-cha, rhumba, pasodoble and jive.

Schedule
All times are China Standard Time (UTC+08:00)

Results

Quarterfinal

Semifinal

Final

References 

 Results
 Report of the Final Round

Dancesport at the 2010 Asian Games